James Walter Gilchrist Jr. is an American political activist and the co-founder and president of the Minuteman Project, an activist group whose aim is to prevent illegal immigration across the southern border of the United States.

Early life
Gilchrist served in the U.S. Marine Corps and received a Purple Heart medal while in the infantry during the Vietnam War, 1968 - 1969.

Minutemen Project

Co-founder of the Minuteman Movement
Gilchrist and Chris Simcox are widely recognized as the founders of the Minuteman Project. They founded the organization on October 1, 2004. The two staged a month-long border watch project in April 2005 and that event catapulted the Minuteman movement into the national spotlight. Gilchrist chose to locate in Arizona for the Project, because there was a disproportionately large number of undocumented immigrants crossing in that state.

Political views
Gilchrist holds conservative views on education, health care, and taxes. Gilchrist was registered with the American Independent Party, the California affiliate of the Constitution Party, but has since re-registered as a Republican, and is an adamant supporter of immigration enforcement, law enforcement and the military. He announced his endorsement of Mike Huckabee for President in December 2007. The endorsement of Huckabee by Gilchrist met with strong criticism from other minutemen and anti-illegal immigration activists. This was a personal, individual endorsement by Gilchrist, not an endorsement by any minuteman organization.

During the 2016 presidential election with regard to the building of a wall and mass deportation directly aligned with the Minuteman Project's missions. Gilchrist stated that he felt that his goals were reaffirmed and accomplished upon his observation of such widespread awareness with regard to immigration issues. He initially supported Ted Cruz for president, who openly criticized Barack Obama's policy of amnesty and was a consistent opponents against Obama's push for immigration reform.

2005 election bid

Gilchrist unsuccessfully ran as an American Independent Party candidate for the United States House of Representatives representing California's 48th congressional district to replace Republican Christopher Cox, who resigned to become Chairman of the U.S. Securities and Exchange Commission.

In the low-turnout open primary for Cox's seat held on October 4, 2005, Gilchrist finished behind two Republicans but ahead of all other candidates, including Democrats. He received 14.8% of the vote (a total of 13,423 votes). He was the only one running under his party, and therefore automatically advanced into the run-off.

Gilchrist lost to Republican state Senator John Campbell in the December 6 general election, receiving 25.5% (26,507) of the vote. Campbell received 44.4% (46,184), Steve Young (Democrat) 27.8% (28,853), Bea Tiritilli (Green) 1.4% (1,430), Bruce Cohen (Libertarian) 0.9% (974).

Controversy
In October 2006, Gilchrist appeared on Democracy Now and abruptly ended the interview after Karina Garcia started accusing him of being a murderer and said that he has ties to the white supremacist group National Alliance.

In a March 2006, interview with the Orange County Register, Gilchrist stopped just short of calling for his followers to pick up their guns:  "I'm not going to promote insurrection, but if it happens, it will be on the conscience of the members of Congress who are doing this," he said. "I will not promote violence in resolving this, but I will not stop others who might pursue that."

In May 2010, Politico reported that Howie Morgan, the Minuteman Project's political director, may have solicited donations from political campaigns in exchange for Gilchrist's endorsement. Rick Perry, Parker Griffith and Tim Bridgewater were all recipients of Gilchrist's endorsements in 2010. Mo Brooks, an Alabama politician running against Griffith, said that Morgan indicated Gilchrist would endorse Brooks if Morgan was hired.

In September 2014, the Daily Show made a segment about the Honduran children immigration featuring an interview with Jim Gilchrist, who compared the recent events at the border with a Trojan Horse situation, the vanguard of a Latino invasion of the United States. The correspondent Michael Che poked fun at Gilchrist's initiative against immigrants, called "Operation Normandy": "If this is Operation Normandy and the children are invading us, wouldn't that make us the Nazis?" . Gilchrist warned against the dangers of the "latinization of America" that the young refugees posed and added, to a baffled interviewer, "We're all going to die some day. (...) I'm not giving a death wish on these children coming  here (...) I'm saying that there's some things realistically you cannot stop."

Books
Minutemen: The Battle to Secure America's Borders, by Jim Gilchrist, Jerome R. Corsi, and Tom Tancredo. Los Angeles: World Ahead Publishing (2006). .

See also

Minuteman Civil Defense Corps

References

External links
Official Website of Jim Gilchrist

1949 births
Living people
American Independent Party politicians
American political candidates
American vigilantes
Military personnel from California
California Republicans
People from Aliso Viejo, California
People from North Providence, Rhode Island
United States Marines
American conspiracy theorists
Activists from California
Far-right politics in the United States